Diatraea dyari is a moth in the family Crambidae. It was described by Harold Edmund Box in 1930. It is found in Argentina.

References

Chiloini
Moths described in 1930